In the Fog is a 2012 war drama film directed by Sergei Loznitsa. The film competed for the Palme d'Or at the 2012 Cannes Film Festival. The film won the Golden Apricot at the 2012 Yerevan International Film Festival, Armenia, for Best Feature Film.

Plot
The film is an adaptation from Vasil Bykaŭ's short story. In 1942 in Belarus during the German occupation, the Germans face strong resistance from the partisans and face the hatred of local people. The partisans suspect Sushenya, a track-walker, of collaboration with the Nazis because he is the only one released of a group of workers who derailed a German train. Two of them capture Sushenya and lead him to the forest where they plan to shoot him. They fall into a trap set by the Germans who severely wound Burov, one of the partisans. Sushenya attempts to save his executioner's life by carrying the wounded partisan on his back to the nearest village. Nevertheless, Sushenya remains under suspicion. He laments that he was a well-respected and trustworthy village resident, raising a family in peace, before the war changed that forever.

Cast
 Vladimir Svirskiy as Sushenya
 Vladislav Abashin as Burov
 Sergei Kolesov as Voitik
 Yulia Peresild as Anelya
 Nadezhda Markina as Burov's mother
 Vlad Ivanov as Grossmeier

Reception
In the Fog has an approval rating of 87% on review aggregator website Rotten Tomatoes, based on 31 reviews, and an average rating of 7.10/10. The consensus on the site states, "While it treads familiar narrative ground -- and is a mite predictable at times -- In the Fog proves a smart, thought-provoking antidote to Hollywood action movies." It also has a score of 78 out of 100 on Metacritic, based on 15 critics, indicating "generally favorable reviews".

Writing for The Guardian, Peter Bradshaw said it was "an intense, slow-burning and haunting drama."

References

External links
 
 
 

2012 films
2012 war drama films
2010s historical drama films
Russian war drama films
Russian historical drama films
Belarusian war films
Belarusian drama films
Dutch drama films
Latvian drama films
2010s Russian-language films
Partisan films
Films set in Belarus
Films set in the 1940s
Eastern Front of World War II films
Films directed by Sergei Loznitsa
Belarusian World War II films
Russian World War II films
Dutch World War II films
German World War II films
2010s German films